The National Research Professorship is an Indian award given to scholars who have made exceptional contribution in their fields.

Notable recipients
 
 Satyendra Nath Bose
 Suniti Kumar Chatterji
 Jayanta Kumar Ray
 C.S. Seshadri
 S.R. Ranganathan

References

Indian awards